Petriroda is a village and a former municipality in the district of Gotha, in Thuringia, Germany. Since December 2019, it is part of the municipality Georgenthal.

References

Gotha (district)
Saxe-Coburg and Gotha
Former municipalities in Thuringia